Fabio Carta (born 6 October 1977 in Turin) is an Italian short track speed skater who competed in the 1998, the 2002, and the 2006 Winter Olympics.

1998 Olympics
In 1998 he was a member of the Italian relay team which finished fourth in the 5000 metre relay competition. In the 1000 metre event he finished sixth and in the 500 metre contest he finished eleventh.

2002 Olympics
Four years later he won the silver medal in the 5000 metre relay contest. In the 1500 metre event he finished fourth, in the 1000 metre contest he finished sixth, and in the 500 metre competition he finished ninth.

2006 Olympics
At the 2006 Games he was part of the Italian team which finished fourth in the 5000 metre relay competition. In the 1500 metre event he finished seventh and in the 1000 metre contest he finished eighth.

References

External links
  (results)
  (bio)
 
 
 

1977 births
Living people
Italian male short track speed skaters
Olympic short track speed skaters of Italy
Olympic silver medalists for Italy
Olympic medalists in short track speed skating
Short track speed skaters at the 1998 Winter Olympics
Short track speed skaters at the 2002 Winter Olympics
Short track speed skaters at the 2006 Winter Olympics
Medalists at the 2002 Winter Olympics
Sportspeople from Turin